Stonebridge at Potomac Town Center, also commonly referred to as Stonebridge PTC or simply Stonebridge, is a  lifestyle center in Woodbridge, Virginia, United States. It features a mix of retail, office buildings, and apartments. was developed by Roadside Developments and construction beginning in 2007. Stonebridge is located along Interstate 95 just east of the freeway, with Opitz Boulevard (SR 2000) to the north, Dale Boulevard (SR 784) to the south, and Potomac Center Boulevard to the east. Continuous expansions to the center are made, with recent additions such as the Alamo Drafthouse Cinema and Potomac Town Center condominiums.

History

Construction of Stonebridge first began in 2007, with the flagship store Wegmans opening in 2008 at the northern end. With completion of construction nearing, the grand opening of the shopping center was in 2012, with some businesses remaining under construction.

In 2012, a plot of forested area beside Stonebridge was chosen to be the new Potomac Nationals stadium, replacing their current home at Pfitzner Stadium along with a commuter parking garage. However, in 2017, plans for this stadium were cancelled and the team moved to Fredericksburg to a new stadium in 2020, and plans for only the commuter garage remained. The commuter garage will be the first in Prince William County and plans for the project will include a ramp providing access to the Interstate 95 Express Lanes.

In June 2018, Alamo Drafthouse Cinema opened its fourth Virginia location and the largest movie theater in the Woodbridge area at Stonebridge.

Businesses
Businesses at Stonebridge include the following:

 Alamo Drafthouse Cinema
 Apple Store
 AT&T
 Bar Louie
 BurgerFi
 Capital One
 Charming Charlie
 Chico's
 Designer Shoe Warehouse
 Duck Donuts
 Jos. A. Bank
 Massage Envy
 Nando's Peri-Peri
 Navy Federal Credit Union
 Old Navy
 Orvis
 Petco Unleashed
 P.F. Chang's
 PNC Bank
 Potbelly Sandwich Shop
 Red Mango
 REI
 Sleep Number
 Starbucks
 ULTA Beauty
 Uncle Julio’s
 UPS Store
 Wegmans
 White House Black Market
 Xfinity

Residential
Stonebridge currently has two residential areas:

 Bell Stonebridge Apartments, formerly called Stonebridge Terrace prior to the Bell Partners acquisition, a 2-building 308-unit apartment complex located northeast of the shopping center.
 Potomac Town Center, a new small community of luxury townhome-style condominiums by Lennar.

See also
 Potomac Mills, a shopping mall adjacent from Stonebridge

External links
 Stonebridge at Potomac Town Center official website

References

Shopping malls in Virginia
Tourist attractions in Prince William County, Virginia
Shopping malls established in 2008
2008 establishments in Virginia
Shopping malls in the Washington metropolitan area
Woodbridge, Virginia